Aubrey's whiptailed skink (Tropidoscincus aubrianus) is a species of skink found in New Caledonia.

References

Tropidoscincus
Reptiles described in 1873
Skinks of New Caledonia
Endemic fauna of New Caledonia
Taxa named by José Vicente Barbosa du Bocage